An unlimited liability corporation (ULC) within Canadian corporate law is a Canadian corporation designation, wherein shareholders are liable up to unlimited amounts for any liability, act or default of the corporation. By comparison, in most corporations, shareholders are not usually liable due to a limited liability model. ULCs can be used by American corporations for tax planning, as ULCs are treated as corporations for Canadian tax purposes but as flow-through entities for American tax purposes.

Unlimited liability corporations have been abolished in Canadian corporate law in most Canadian jurisdictions, but they still exist in three provinces: Alberta, Nova Scotia, and British Columbia.

Usefulness in foreign direct investments by US corporations

ULCs have commonly been used by US companies investing in Canada on a greenfield basis or through corporate acquisitions of Canadian entities or assets, especially if those Canadian assets or operations are expected to generate business losses. This became especially significant after the 1997 introduction of the entity classification rules in the US Internal Revenue Code which provided that:

In essence, the ULC can act as a “flow-through” or “disregarded” entity for US tax purposes as the US tax rules “look through” the ULC to its shareholder(s). In contrast, the ULC is treated as a corporation, and is subject to tax at the corporate level, for Canadian tax purposes.

Nova Scotia had been the last of the Canadian jurisdictions to allow the incorporation of such corporations at that time. Since then, Alberta allowed such formations in 2005, followed by British Columbia in 2007, to take advantage of this niche provided by US tax law.

Changes to Canada–US tax treaty, 2010

Effective January 1, 2010, the Canada–US tax treaty—formally, the Canada–United States Convention with Respect to Taxes on Income and on Capital, signed September 26, 1980—was amended by inserting a new Article IV(7):

As a ULC is generally considered for US tax purposes to be considered "fiscally transparent" under this provision, this will mean that payments (such as interest, royalties and dividends) from a Canadian ULC to its US parent will be subject to a 25% withholding tax under Part XIII of the Income Tax Act (Canada). However, technical guidance issued by the Canada Revenue Agency has indicated that certain strategies are available to mitigate the impact of such changes.

Applicable law by jurisdiction

See also
List of Acts of Parliament of Canada

References

Types of business entity
Canadian corporate law